Leuzinger and its diaspora variant Leutzinger is a Swiss German habitational surname denoting a person originally living in the Swiss hamlet of Leuzingen in the former municipality of Netstal in the Canton of Glarus and may refer to:
Bruno Leuzinger (1886–1952), Swiss ice hockey player
Franz Keller-Leuzinger (1835–1890), German explorer, painter, writer, illustrator and engineer
George Leuzinger (1813–1892), Swiss Brazilian photographer
James Leuzinger (born 1982), Swiss born British alpine skier
Rudolf Leuzinger (1826–1896), Swiss cartographer

References 

German-language surnames
Swiss-German surnames